Mazu is a 2012 mythology fantasy television series directed by Lu Qi and starring Liu Tao, Stephen Wong Ka-lok, and Yan Kuan. The television series also stars Roy Liu, Wei Zongwan, Zhao Hongfei, Coffee Lü, and Ruby Lin. It is based on the Chinese myths of Mazu.

Cast
 Liu Tao as Mazu
 Guan Xiaotong as young Mazu (Lin Moniang) 
 Stephen Wong Ka-lok as Yang Shengquan
 Wan Changhao as Yang Shengquan
 Yan Kuan as Wu Zonglun
 Wei Zongwan as Dragon King
 Liu Jia as Mother Wang, Mazu's mother.
 Roy Liu as Lin Yuan, Mazu's father.
 Zhao Hongfei as Ya Zi, Dragon King's son.
 Coffee Lü as Guihua, Lin Yuan's adopted daughter.
 Ruby Lin as Guanyin.
 Hu Biao as Lin Hongyi, Mazu's elder brother.
 Wang Yamei as Li Haiyan, Lin Hongyi's wife.
 Zhuang Qingning as Lin Miaozhu, Mazu's elder sister.

Critical reception
The television series received positive reviews.

The television series earned the Full-length Television Series Second Prize at the 29th Flying Apsaras Awards.

References

External links
   Mazu Sina

2012 Chinese television series debuts
Shenmo television series
Television series set in the Northern Song
Television shows based on Chinese novels
Television shows set in Fujian